The 1990 Sovran Bank Classic was a men's tennis tournament played on outdoor hard courts at the William H.G. FitzGerald Tennis Center in Washington, D.C. in the United States that was part of the Championship Series of the 1990 ATP Tour. It was the 22nd edition of the tournament was held from July 16 through July 22, 1990. First-seeded Andre Agassi won the singles title and earned $70,000 first-prize money.

Finals

Singles

 Andre Agassi defeated  Jim Grabb 6–1, 6–4
 It was Agassi's third singles title of the year and the 11th of his career.

Doubles

 Grant Connell /  Glenn Michibata defeated  Jorge Lozano /  Todd Witsken 2–6, 6–4, 6–2

References

External links
 Official website
 ATP tournament profile

Sovran Bank Classic
Washington Open (tennis)
1990 in sports in Washington, D.C.
1990 in American tennis